This list of Indian women in dance includes women from India or of Indian parentage who are notable for their involvement with modern or traditional Indian dance, as dancers or choreographers. This list is not for women whose involvement with dance is not central to their careers, as is the case with many Bollywood actresses.

Choreographers

 Rukmini Devi Arundale
 Saroj Khan
 Chitra Visweswaran
 Oopali Operajita
 Farah Khan
 Vaibhavi Merchant
 Kala
 Geeta Kapoor
 Brinda
 Pony Verma
 Gauri Jog
 Chandralekha
 Savitha Sastry

Dancers

 Jaishree Dudi
 Alarmel Valli
 Anila Sunder
 Baisali Mohanty
 Balasaraswati T
 Bhanupriya
 Deepti Omchery Bhalla
 Esha Deol
 Gauhar Jaan
 Hema Malini
 Jugnu Ishiqui
 Kalamandalam Kalyanikutty Amma
 Kumari Kamala
 Kanak Rele
 Kasturi Pattanaik
 Leela Samson
 Madhavi Mudgal
 Mallika Sarabhai
 Mamata Shankar
 Manisha Gulyani
 Manju Bhargavi
 Manju Warrier
 Medha Yodh
 Meenakshi Seshadri
 Meenakshi Srinivasan
 Mrinalini Sarabhai
 Mallika Sarabhai
 Mukti Mohan
 Mumaith Khan
 Murugashankari Leo
 Mythili Kumar
 Mythili Prakash
 Oopali Operajita
 Padma Subramanyam
 Padmini
 Pali Chandra
 Prachi Shah
 Prerana Deshpande
 Protima Bedi
 Rajee Narayan
 Rekha Raju
 Rukmini Devi Arundale
 Sanjukta Panigrahi
 Saroja Vaidyanathan
 Saswati Sen
 Savitha Sastry
 Shakti Mohan
 Sharada Srinivasan
 Sharmila Biswas
 Shashi Sankhla
 Shobhana Chandrakumar
 Shobha Naidu
 Shovana Narayan
 Smitha Rajan
 Sneha Kapoor
 Sonal Mansingh
 Sreelakshmy Govardhanan
 Sudha Chandran
 Sujata Mohapatra
 Sunanda Nair
 Swati Bhise
 Tanusree Shankar
 Vasundhara Doraswamy
 Vibha Dadheech
 Viji Prakash
 Vyjayanthimala
 Yamini Reddy

See also
 List of dancers

References

 
Dance, women
Dance
Lists of female dancers